Tony Ianzelo    (born June 13, 1935) is a Canadian documentary director and cinematographer.

Career
Ianzelo was born in Toronto, Ontario, and attended Toronto's Ryerson Institute of Technology. His career at the National Film Board of Canada was characterized by an empathic portrayal of his subjects, and he gained a reputation for compassion and honesty through sensitive films and unobtrusive cinematography.

He joined the NFB in 1960 as a camera assistant and, in 1966, made his first film, Antonio. This short piece, which uses his own father as a subject to explore the themes of family, immigration and alienation, was shown in schools and institutions for three decades after its release. A prolific and innovative artist, he retired in the late 1990s with over one hundred film credits.

Best known for his quiet empathy and unobtrusive camera-work, he worked with the NFB program Challenge for Change, where he used his skills on such films as Cree Hunters of Mistassini with Boyce Richardson, and other projects in Canada's Far North. In 1986, with Colin Low, he co-directed Transitions, the first-ever 3D IMAX film, which premiered at Expo 86 in Vancouver.

Ianzelo was one of the first cinematographers to become a member of the Royal Canadian Academy of Arts, and received numerous awards and commendations, including the 1975 BAFTA Award for Best Documentary (for Cree Hunters of Mistassini) and two Academy Award nominations (for Blackwood in 1976 and High Grass Circus in 1977). In 2004, in recognition of his lifetime contribution to documentary cinema, he was invested as Member of the Order of Canada

Filmography
(All for the National Film Board of Canada)

Antonio - documentary short 1966 - director, cinematographer, editor
The Ever-Changing Lowlands - documentary short 1966 - director, cinematographer
All Systems Go - documentary short, Richard Gilbert 1966 - cinematographer
The Long Haul Men - documentary short, Richard Gilbert 1966 - cinematographer
Canada and the American Revolution: 1763-1783 - documentary, Ronald Dick and Pierre L’Amare 1967 - cinematographer
The Accessible Arctic - documentary short, David Bairstow 1967 - cinematographer
Inmate Training - training film, Peter Pearson 1967 - cinematographer
A Question of Priority - training film, Peter Pearson 1967 - cinematographer
Chain of Command - training film, Peter Pearson 1967 - cinematographer
Compassionate Leave? - training film, Peter Pearson 1967 - cinematographer
The Tactless One - training film, Peter Pearson 1967 - cinematographer
The Defaulter - training film, Peter Pearson 1967 - cinematographer
Impressions of Expo ‘67 - documentary short, William Brind 1967 - cinematographer
Isotopes in Action - documentary short, Kenneth McCready 1967 - cinematographer
The North Has Changed - documentary short, David Bairstow 1967 - cinematographer
We’re Gonna Have Recess - documentary short, Michael J.F. Scott 1967 - cinematographer
New England and New France: 1490-1763 - documentary, Ronald Dick and Pierre L’Amare 1967 - cinematographer
Oskee Wee Wee - documentary short, William Pettigrew 1968 - cinematographer
Saul Alinksy Went to War - documentary, Peter Pearson and Donald Brittain 1968 - cinematographer
Cosmic Zoom - documentary short, Robert Verrall 1968 - cinematographer
Flight in White - documentary short, William Canning 1968 - cinematographer
The New Equation: Annexationism and Reciprocity: 1840-1860 - documentary, Ronald Dick and Pierre L’Amare 1968 - cinematographer
Dangerous Decades: 1818-1846 - documentary, Ronald Dick and Pierre L’Amare 1968 - cinematographer
People and Power - documentary short, Bonnie Sherr Klein and Peter Pearson 1968 - cinematographer
Building an Organization - documentary short, Bonnie Sherr Klein and Peter Pearson 1968 - cinematographer
A Continuing Responsibility - documentary short, Bonnie Sherr Klein 1968 - cinematographer
Deciding to Organize - documentary short, Bonnie Sherr Klein and Peter Pearson 1968 - cinematographer
Through Conflict to Negotiation - documentary, Bonnie Sherr Klein and Peter Pearson 1968 - cinematographer
They’re Putting Us Off the Map - documentary short, Michael J.F. Scott  1968 - cinematographer
Mrs. Ryan’s Drama Class - documentary short, Michael Rubbo 1969 - cinematographer
The Dowry - short film, Peter Pearson 1969 - cinematographer
Altitude Zero to Infinity - documentary short, Richard Gilbert 1969 - cinematographer
Bing Bang Boom - documentary short, Joan Henson 1969 - cinematographer
You Are on Indian Land - documentary short, Mike Kanentakeron Mitchell 1969 - cinematographer
The Best Damn Fiddler from Calabogie to Kaladar - documentary, Peter Pearson 1969 - cinematographer
The War of 1812: Causes and Consequences: 1783-1818 - documentary, Ronald Dick and Pierre L’Amare 1967 - cinematographer
The Friendly 50s and the Sinister Sixties: 1850-1863 - documentary, Ronald Dick and Pierre L’Amare 1969 - cinematographer
The Triumphant Union and the Canadian Confederation: 1863-1867 - documentary, Ronald Dick and Pierre L’Amare 1969 - cinematographer
The Border Confirmed: The Treaty of Washington: 1867-1871 - documentary, Ronald Dick and Pierre L’Amare 1969 - cinematographer
A Second Transcontinental Nation: 1872 - documentary, Ronald Dick and Pierre L’Amare 1969 - cinematographer
Go With Us - documentary short, William Canning 1970 - cinematographer
Freud: The Hidden Nature of Man - documentary short (non-NFB), George Kaczender  1970 - cinematographer
Don't Knock the Ox - documentary short 1970 - director, cinematographer
Fort Who? - documentary short, William Brind 1970 - cinematographer
Here’s to Harry’s Grandfather - documentary, Michael Rubbo 1970 - cinematographer
Tee-Won Short - documentary short, Michael J.F. Scott 1970 - cinematographer
That’s the Price - documentary, Michael J.F. Scott 1970 - cinematographer
Temples of Time - documentary, William Canning 1971 - cinematographer
The Unplanned - documentary short, Andy Thomson 1971 - cinematographer
Angus - documentary short, Andy Thomson and Michael J.F. Scott 1971 - cinematographer
Don Messer - His Land and His Music - documentary, Martin Defalco 1971 - cinematographer
En Garde - documentary short, William Canning 1971 - cinematographer
God Help the Man Who Would Part with His Land - documentary short, George C. Stoney 1971 - cinematographer
Here is Canada - documentary short 1972 - director, cinematographer
A Bus - For Us - documentary short, Rex Tasker 1972 - cinematographer
Goodbye Sousa - documentary short 1973 - director, cinematographer
Our Land is Our Life - documentary 1974 - cinematographer and, with Boyce Richardson, director
Bate's Car: Sweet as a Nut - documentary short 1974 - director, cinematographer
Cree Hunters of Mistassini - documentary 1974 - cinematographer and, with Boyce Richardson, director
Ready When You Are - documentary short, John N. Smith and Douglas Kiefer 1975 - cinematographer
Bill Loosely’s Heat Pump - documentary short, Kenneth McCready 1975 - cinematographer
Cold Journey - feature, Martin Defalco 1975 - cinematographer
Alberta Girls - documentary 1975 - cinematographer, editor and, with Malca Gillson, director
Musicanada - documentary short 1975 - cinematographer and, with Malca Gillson, director
Blackwood - documentary short 1976 - director, cinematographer 
High Grass Circus - documentary short 1976 - cinematographer and, with Torben Schioler, director
Striker - documentary short, Robert Nichol 1976 - cinematographer 
The Whales Are Waiting - documentary short 1976 - cinematographer and, with Strowen Robertson and Andy Thomson, director
Cree Way - documentary short 1977 - director, cinematographer
Little Big Top - documentary short 1977 - cinematographer, editor and, with Torben Schioler, director
Games of the XXI Olympiad - documentary, Jean-Claude Labrecque, Jean Beaudin, Marcel Carrière and Georges Dufaux 1977
The Mighty Steam Calliope - documentary short 1978 - cinematographer and director
Viking Visitors to North America - documentary short 1979 - cinematographer and, with Anthony Kent, director
Canada Vignettes: Don Messer - His Land and His Music - Don Messer 1910-1973 - documentary short, Martin Defalco 1979 - cinematographer
Canada Vignettes: Don Messer - His Land and His Music - Charlie Chamberlain 1911-1972, Marg Osburne 1927-1977 - documentary short, Martin Defalco 1979 - cinematographer
Canada Vignettes: Don Messer - His Land and His Music - Charlie Chamberlain 1911-1972 - two documentary shorts, Martin Defalco 1979 - cinematographer
Canada Vignettes: Don Messer - His Land and His Music - Marg Osburne 1927-1977 - two documentary shorts, Martin Defalco 1979 - cinematographer
Canada Vignettes: Cree Hunters - documentary short 1979 - director, cinematographer
Canada Vignettes: Breadmakers - documentary short 1980 - director, cinematographer
Canada Vignettes: Calliope - documentary short 1980 - director, cinematographer
China: A Land Transformed - documentary short 1980 - cinematographer and, with Boyce Richardson, director
North China Commune - documentary 1980 - cinematographer and, with Boyce Richardson, director
North China Factory - documentary 1980 - cinematographer and, with Boyce Richardson, director
Wuxing People’s Commune - documentary 1980 - cinematographer and, with Boyce Richardson, director
Canada Vignettes: Celebration - documentary short 1981 - director, cinematographer
In Search of Farley Mowat - documentary, William Brind 1981 - cinematographer
Gala - documentary, John N. Smith and Michael McKennirey 1982 - cinematographer
The Concert Man - documentary short 1982 - director, cinematographer
Learning Ringette - documentary short 1982 - cinematographer and, with Bill Graziadei, director
Singing: A Joy in Any Language - documentary 1983 - cinematographer and, with Malca Gillson,  director
Musical Magic: Gilbert and Sullivan in Stratford - documentary, Malca Gillson 1984 - cinematographer
From Ashes to Forest - documentary 1984 - director, cinematographer
Max Ward - documentary, William Canning 1984 - cinematographer
Overtime - documentary, Marrin Canell 1984 - cinematographer
Transitions - documentary short 1986 - director, with Colin Low
Making Transitions - documentary short 1986 - director
Feeding and Clothing China's Millions - documentary short, Dennis Sawyer 1986 - cinematographer
School in the Bush - documentary short, Dennis Sawyer 1986 - cinematographer
Give Me Your Answer True - documentary 1987 - director, with Stefan Wodoslawsky
Tiger Emperor - documentary short 1988 - director 
Emergency - documentary short 1988 - director, with Colin Low
The First Emperor of China - documentary 1989 - director, with Liu Hao Xue 
Momentum - documentary short 1992 - director, with Colin Low
The Art of the Animator - documentary series 1993 - director, cinematographer
Eldon Rathburn: They Shoot... He Scores - documentary short, Louis Hone 1995 - cinematographer
Making Momentum - documentary short 1996 - director, with Colin Low
Louisbourg Under Siege - documentary, Albert Kish 1997 - cinematographer
Postcards from Canada - documentary 2000 - director, cinematographer

Awards
Cosmic Zoom (1968)
Berlin International Film Festival – UNIATEC Award of Excellence, 1972
The Best Damn Fiddler from Calabogie to Kaladar (1969)
 21st Canadian Film Awards, Toronto: Genie Award for Best Black and White Cinematography, 1969
Don't Knock the Ox (1970)
Canadian Film Awards, Toronto – Genie Award for Best Theatrical Short Film, 1971
Film Critics and Journalists Association of Ceylon, Sri Lanka – Certificate of Merit, 1971
Here is Canada (1972)
Festival of Tourist and Folklore Films, Brussels - Award of the Ministry of National Education, 1973
Golden Gate Awards Competition & International Film Festival, San Francisco – Special Jury Award, 1973
Goodbye Sousa (1973)
Canadian Film Awards, Montreal – Genie Award for Best Theatrical Short Film, 1973
Cree Hunters of Mistassini (1974)
BAFTA (British Academy Film Awards), London – BAFTA Award for Best Documentary (Robert Flaherty Award), 1975
Canadian Film Awards, Niagara-on-the-Lake, ON - Genie Award for Best Documentary, 1975
Melbourne Film Festival – Silver Boomerang, Best film made specifically for TV, 1975
Bate's Car: Sweet as a Nut (1974)
Biofest, Novi Sad, Yugoslavia – Award of Excellence, 1975
Musicanada (1975)
Golden Gate Awards Competition & International Film Festival, San Francisco – Special Jury Award, 1976
Blackwood (1976)
 Festival international du film sur l'art, Paris: Grand Prize for the Quality of the Image, 1977
 Festival of Tourist and Folklore Films, Brussels: Prize of the Principality of Monaco for the Best Film Evocating the Past of a Region by the Means of Art, 1977
 Yorkton Film Festival, Yorkton, Saskatchewan: Golden Sheaf Award, Best Short Film, 1977
 49th Academy Awards, Los Angeles: Nominee, Best Documentary Short Subject, 1977
High Grass Circus (1976)
Yorkton Film Festival, Yorkton, Saskatchewan - Golden Sheaf Award for Best Film of the Festival, 1977
Film Advisory Board, Los Angeles - Award of Excellence, 1978
50th Academy Awards, Los Angeles – Nominee, Best Documentary Feature
North China Commune (1980)
Columbus International Film & Animation Festival, Columbus, Ohio - Chris Bronze Plaque, Social Studies, 1980
From Ashes to Forest (1984)
International Green Film Week, Berlin - Bronze Ear of Corn Award, Environment, 1986
Momentum (1992)
FIAFest: Festival Internacional Audiovisual, Seville - Award for the Technical Quality of the Image, 1992
The Art of the Animator (1993)
National Educational Media Network Competition, Oakland, California – Golden Apple Award, Arts, 1995

References

External links
 
 Watch films by Tony Ianzelo at NFB.ca

1935 births
Living people
Best Cinematography Genie and Canadian Screen Award winners
Canadian cinematographers
Canadian documentary film directors
Canadian people of Italian descent
Directors of Genie and Canadian Screen Award winners for Best Documentary Film
Film directors from Toronto
Members of the Order of Canada
Members of the Royal Canadian Academy of Arts
National Film Board of Canada people
Toronto Metropolitan University alumni